A car phone is a mobile radio telephone specifically designed for and fitted into an automobile.
This service originated with the Bell System and was first used in St. Louis, Missouri, United States on June 17, 1946.

Overview
Later, more licenses were added, bringing the total to 32 channels across 3 bands (See IMTS frequencies). This service was used at least into the 1980s in large portions of North America.

On October 2, 1946, Motorola communications equipment carried the first calls on Illinois Bell Telephone Company's new car radiotelephone service in Chicago. Due to the small number of radio frequencies available, the service quickly reached capacity.

In Finland, car phone service was first available in 1971 on the zero generation ARP (Autoradiopuhelin, or Car Radiophone) service. This was succeeded in 1982 by the 1G system NMT (Nordic Mobile Telephone), used across Scandinavia and in other often remote areas.

In West Germany, the car phone service was first released in 1958 as the A-Netz service. In 1971, it reached its capacity limit of almost 11,000 subscribers and was succeeded by B-Netz in 1972, which featured direct dialling, not requiring a human operator to connect calls. However, in order to reach a subscriber, one would still need to know their location since the handset would assume the local area code of the base station serving it. It was succeeded in 1985 by the C-Netz 1G system.

In North America, car phones typically used the Mobile Telephone Service (MTS), which was first used in St. Louis, or Improved Mobile Telephone Service (IMTS) before giving way to analog cellular service (AMPS) in 1984. AMPS technology was discontinued in the United States in 2008.

Since a traditional car phone uses a high-power transmitter and external antenna, it is ideal for rural or undeveloped areas where mobile handsets may not work well or at all.  However, due to current US Federal Communications Commission regulations, carriers must pay penalties for activating any equipment that is not an E911 compliant device, such as analog.

In the 1980s, the car phone was more popular than the mobile phone. However, as mobile phones became lighter and more affordable during the mobile phone boom in the 1990s, car phones became less common. By the 2000s, car phones had become uncommon due to the convenience of mobile phones along with in-car mobile phone integrative technologies such as Bluetooth.

There were still some car phones available as recently as 2008, including the Nokia 810 and the Motorola VC6096 for use with GSM networks and a car phone made by NAL Research for the Iridium satellite network. Motorola provided US customers with the m800 and m900 car phones, for use with CDMA and GSM networks respectively. Some car phones had colour screens and supported high-speed data connections as well as the ability to access SIM cards stored in other phones via Bluetooth.

Since 2008, many automobiles have featured integrated, "hands-free" systems to utilize a consumer's cellular phone, via a Bluetooth wireless link or use an integrated transceiver. The systems use an internally mounted microphone, and the car's audio system, and may feature voice activation and control.

See also 
 OnStar, emergency notification system
 Teleaid, automatic emergency call system

References

External links
 

Automotive technologies
Mobile telecommunications user equipment
Telecommunications-related introductions in 1946